Al-Mina'a is a basketball club, located in Al Maqal, Basra, Iraq that plays in the Iraq Basketball League.

Notable players

 Travis Tyler.
 Cedric Ridle Jr.
 David Nesbitt.

Current roster

Honours
 Iraq Basketball League:  
  Runners up (1): 2015–16

See also
 Al-Mina'a SC

References

External links
Al Mina basketball team Page on Asia Basket
Iraqi Basketball Federation Page
Iraq Basketball League at goalzz.com

Basketball teams established in 1931
Basketball teams in Iraq
Basketball